Gunn-Vivian Eide (born 21 May 1964) is a Norwegian politician for the Liberal Party.

From 1990 to 1992 she was the leader of the Young Liberals of Norway, the youth wing of the Liberal Party.

She served as a deputy representative to the Parliament of Norway from Hordaland during the term 1997–2001. In total she met during 3 days of parliamentary session. From 1995 to 1999 she was the municipal councillor (kommunalråd) of Bergen.

References

1964 births
Living people
Deputy members of the Storting
Liberal Party (Norway) politicians
Politicians from Bergen
Norwegian women in politics
Women members of the Storting